Adelopoma is a genus of land snails that have an operculum and a gill, terrestrial gastropod mollusks in the family Diplommatinidae.

Species
Species within the genus Adelopoma include:
Adelopoma brasiliense Morretes, 1954
Adelopoma costaricense Bartsch & J. P. E. Morrison, 1942
Adelopoma paulistanum Martins & Simone, 2014
Adelopoma peruvianum Hausdorf & Munoz, 2004
Adelopoma stolli Martens, 1890
Adelopoma tucma Doering, 1885

References

Cyclophoridae
Taxonomy articles created by Polbot